Stephen of Tours (century) or Marcay was seneschal of Anjou from before 1160 to 1189, when he was imprisoned by  of England for fiscal mismanagement. He was freed and restored to the position from 1190 to 1196. Between his two terms, the position was held by Payen, lord of Rochefort.

Stephen was sometimes credited with the creation or possession of a brazen head.

References

12th-century French people